The women's javelin throw event at the 2003 All-Africa Games was held on October 13.

Results

References

Javelin